The Meridian Public School District is a public school district based in Meridian, Mississippi (USA). Its service area is the same as the city limits of Meridian.

Schools
 High schools
Meridian High School 
1984-1985 National Blue Ribbon School
Ross Collins Career and Technical Center
 Junior high schools
Kate Griffin Junior High School
1986-1987 National Blue Ribbon School
Northwest Junior High School
Middle schools
Carver Middle School
1988-1989 National Blue Ribbon School
Magnolia Middle School
Northwest Middle School
Elementary schools
Crestwood Elementary School
Oakland Heights Elementary School
Parkview Elementary School
Poplar Springs Elementary School
T. J. Harris Elementary School
West Hills Elementary School

Former schools
Marion Park Elementary School
1985-1986 National Blue Ribbon School
Highland Elementary School
Mount Barton Elementary School
West End Elementary School
 Witherspoon Elementary School

Discipline litigation
The district agreed in 2013 to change how it disciplined students after the United States Department of Justice sued officials over inappropriate arrests of suspended students.

Demographics

2006-07 school year
There were a total of 6,630 students enrolled in the Meridian Public School District during the 2006–2007 school year. The gender makeup of the district was 50% female and 50% male. The racial makeup of the district was 82.90% African American, 15.25% White, 1.09% Hispanic, 0.65% Asian, and 0.12% Native American. 71.7% of the district's students were eligible to receive free lunch.

Previous school years

Accountability statistics

See also
List of school districts in Mississippi

References

External links
 

Meridian, Mississippi
Education in Lauderdale County, Mississippi
School districts in Mississippi